Dwight Yates is a writer former lecturer at the University of California, Riverside. His fiction has appeared in numerous literary journals, including Northwest Review, ZYZZYVA, Western Humanities Review, Quarterly West, and Sonora Review.

Born in Montana, Yates has worked as a secondary school master, medical practitioner in East Africa, and soldier in the U.S. military. He lectured at the University of California, Riverside for 13 years retiring after the 2001-2002 school year.

Yates was a Pushcart Prize Special Mention in 1992 and was awarded the National Endowment for the Arts (NEA) Fellowship in Fiction in 1993.

His first collection of short stories, Haywire Hearts and Slide Trombones, won the Serena McDonald Kennedy Fiction Award from Snake Nation Press in 2005,  while his second collection of short fiction, Bring Everybody, won the inaugural Juniper Prize for Fiction from the University of Massachusetts Press.

In 2007Yates was awarded his second NEA fellowship while he continued work on a long-deferred novel.

References

External links 
 University of California, Riverside - biographical page for Dwight Yates

University of California, Riverside faculty
Living people
American male writers
Year of birth missing (living people)